NGC 2770 is a spiral galaxy in the northern constellation of Lynx, near the northern constellation border with Cancer. It was discovered by German-born astronomer William Herschel on December 7, 1785. J. L. E. Dreyer described it as, "faint, large, much extended 150°, mottled but not resolved, 2 stars to north". NGC 2770 was the target for the first binocular image produced by the Large Binocular Telescope.

The morphological classification of SBc indicates a barred spiral with moderately-wound arms. The physical properties of this galaxy are similar to those of the Milky Way. There are no apparent perturbations of the galaxy due to suspected interaction with the companion galaxy, NGC 2770B.

As of 2017, up to four supernovae events have been discovered in this galaxy. Three were of Type Ib: SN 1999eh, SN 2007uy, and SN 2008D. The last of these was the first supernova detected by the X-rays released very early on in its formation, rather than by the optical light emitted during the later stages, which allowed the first moments of the outburst to be observed. It is possible that NGC 2770's interactions with a suspected companion galaxy may have created the massive stars causing this activity. SN 2015bh, discovered in NGC 2770 in February 2015, was either a Type II supernova or the hyper-eruption of a luminous blue variable.

References

Further reading

External links

Astronomers Witness Supernova's First Moments

Barred spiral galaxies
2770
Lynx (constellation)
025806